Spencer Township is one of eleven townships in Jennings County, Indiana, United States. As of the 2010 census, its population was 2,326 and it contained 911 housing units.

Geography
The streams of Indian Creek, Little Mutton Creek, Powder Creek, Storm Creek, Tea Creek and Twomile Creek run through this township.

Unincorporated towns
 Four Corners
 Hayden

Adjacent townships
 Geneva Township (north)
 Center Township (east)
 Vernon Township (east)
 Lovett Township (southeast)
 Marion Township (south)
 Vernon Township, Jackson County (southwest)
 Washington Township, Jackson County (southwest)
 Jackson Township, Jackson County (west)
 Redding Township, Jackson County (west)

Cemeteries
The township contains eight cemeteries: Barkman, Hunt, Myers, Saint Catherines, Saint James, Sixmile, Whitcomb and Wohrer.

Major highways
  U.S. Route 50

References
 U.S. Board on Geographic Names (GNIS)
 United States Census Bureau cartographic boundary files

External links
 Indiana Township Association
 United Township Association of Indiana

Townships in Jennings County, Indiana
Townships in Indiana